†Nerinellidae is an extinct taxonomic family of fossil sea snails, marine gastropod mollusks in the informal group Lower Heterobranchia.

Genera
Genera within the family Nerinellidae include:
 Nerinella, the type genus

References 

 The Taxonomicon